Koh-Lanta: Les 4 Terres is the twenty-first regular season and the twenty-fifth season overall of the French reality television series Koh-Lanta. For the first time in the show's history, four tribes representing a region of France will compete against each other (North = Vualiku, East = Tokalo, South = Ceva, West = Vakara), in challenges to win rewards as well as immunity to avoid being sent to tribal council and vote off one of their own. A big twist this season is for the first time, none of the starting tribes have the traditional colours of Koh-Lanta; red and yellow. In addition, 24 contestants compete for 40 days to win €100,000 and win the title of Sole Survivor. The season premiered on 28 August 2020. In the end, Alexandra Pornet won against Brice Petit in a jury vote of 7-5 to win the title of Sole Survivor. After the death of Bertrand-Kamal, a donation site was created to pay tribute to him.

Contestants

Future appearances 
Alix Noblat, Loïc Riowal & Alexandra Pornet returned to compete in Koh-Lanta: La Légende.

Challenges

Voting history

Notes

References

External links

French reality television series
Koh-Lanta seasons
2020 French television seasons
Television shows filmed in Fiji